Autumn Fires (and Green Shoots) is a solo album led by composer and pianist Django Bates which was recorded in 1994 and released on the JMT label.

Reception

AllMusic awarded the album 4 stars, stating "English pianist Django Bates has a crazy sense of humor, the ability to use dissonance and noise as a logical part of his music, and a fresh approach to group playing. On this CD, a solo piano outing, he is more subtle than on his group albums and the music takes a little while to cut loose".

Track listing
All compositions by Django Bates except as indicated
 "Autumn Leaves (Autumn Fires)" (Joseph Kosma, Johnny Mercer, Jacques Prévert) – 6:16
 "Sweetie" – 5:41
 "Jetty" – 5:12
 "Ralf's Trip" – 3:36
 "Is There Anyone Up There?" – 6:00
 "Hollyhocks" – 6:07 	
 "Solitude" (Duke Ellington, Eddie DeLange, Irving Mills) – 5:25 	
 "The Loneliness of Being Right (Part 2)" – 3:39
 "Rat King" – 1:54
 "Dufy" – 4:52
 "Giant Steps" (John Coltrane) – 3:40 	
 "Calm Farm (For Paggy)" – 4:35 	
 "Infinity in a Twinkling" – 7:41

Personnel
Django Bates – piano

References 

1994 albums
Django Bates albums
JMT Records albums
Winter & Winter Records albums
Albums recorded at Electric Lady Studios
Solo piano jazz albums